Lillian Leitzel (born Leopoldina Alitza Pelikan; 2 January 1892 – 15 February 1931) was a German-born acrobat who specialized in performing on the Roman Rings, for the Ringling Brothers and Barnum and Bailey Circus.  The inaugural (posthumous) inductee to the International Circus Hall of Fame, Leitzel died in hospital two days after a fall during a live performance.

Early life
Leitzel was born as Leopoldina Alitza Pelikan in a family of circus performers. Her father was most likely Willy Dosta, an itinerant circus performer; another possible candidate was Edward J. Eleanore, a Hungarian army officer and theater performer. Her mother, Nellie Pelikan, was a Czech circus acrobat. Nellie was one of 6 children born to Eduard Pelikan, an acrobat/clown/strongman. Eduard's son Adolf performed as a clown under the pseudonym "Bluch Landolf".  Lillian's brother, Alfred Pelikan, later became director of the Milwaukee Art Institute.

She spent her childhood in Germany, where she lived with her maternal grandparents.  Although she had been well-educated and had prepared to pursue a career as a concert pianist, she joined her mother's aerobatic circus group, the Leamy Ladies. The troupe was completed by her aunts Tina and Toni and Lily Simpson and they toured Europe in 1905.

In 1910, she came to the United States with the circus troupe and performed with Barnum and Bailey. The group later dissolved and its members returned to Europe, but Leitzel continued to attempt to perform in the American vaudeville circuit. In South Bend, Indiana, she was seen by an agent of the Ringling Brothers who offered her a contract. When Ringling and Barnum and Bailey merged, she became a huge star and a headline performer for the circus.

Act and personality

Leitzel's act included one-armed planges, momentarily dislocating the shoulder during each plange. She would flip her body over her shoulder repeatedly, sometimes hundreds of times in a feat of endurance, encouraging the audience to count each one in unison. Only four feet, nine inches, she was also famous for her demanding personality and temper. Leitzel was the first performer in history to command her own private Pullman car completely furnished with her own baby grand piano.

Her quick temper was legendary. It was not uncommon to witness Leitzel cursing or slapping a roustabout who did not adjust her rigging exactly to her liking. Further, Leitzel was known to fly off the handle and fire then rehire her personal maid, Mabel Cummings, several times a day. In sharp contrast, she was known to the children on the show as "Auntie Leitzel", and she would hold birthday parties for her fellow performers in her private dressing tent.

Marriages
The identity of her first husband is unknown. She married Clyde Ingalls in 1920, and the couple divorced in 1924. Her third husband was circus trapeze performer Alfredo Codona, whom she wed in 1928.

Accident and death
On 13 February 1931, she fell to the ground from her rigging while performing in Copenhagen, Denmark at the Valencia Music Hall, when the swivel that held the rope in place fractured and snapped. She and Codona had been performing in Europe separately, and he rushed to Copenhagen. After she apparently showed signs of improvement, Codona returned to his company in Berlin. However, she died on 15 February, two days after the fall, aged 39. She was buried in Inglewood Park Cemetery in Inglewood, California.

Honors
Lillian Leitzel was the first inductee elected into the International Circus Hall of Fame in 1958.

A vintage circus poster depicting her was used as the subject of a United States postage stamp issued as part of a set on 5 May 2014.

In media
The book Queen of the Air: A True Story of Love and Tragedy at the Circus by Dean N. Jensen, is about Lillian Leitzel. It was published by Crown in 2013 (/).

References

External links

Lillian Leitzel's biography at the official Ringling Bros. website
Collection of informational articles about Lillian Leitzel's career and life
Biography of Queen of the Circus Lillian Leitzel, part 1 at Trivia Library
Bio, part 2 at Trivia Library
Bio, part 3 at Trivia Library
CemeteryGuide.com website

1892 births
1931 deaths
Accidental deaths from falls
Deaths onstage
Acrobats
Strongwomen
Burials at Inglewood Park Cemetery
People from Wrocław
People from the Province of Silesia
German emigrants to the United States
German entertainers
Circus strongmen and strongwomen